Petriolo is a comune (municipality) in the Province of Macerata in the Italian region Marche, located about  south of Ancona and about  south of Macerata.

Petriolo borders the following municipalities: Corridonia, Loro Piceno, Mogliano, Tolentino, Urbisaglia.

Among the churches in the town are: 
Madonna della Misericordia
Madonna della Grazie
Santa Maria a Petriolo
Santa Maria del Soccorso
Santi Martino e Marco

Demographic evolution

References

Cities and towns in the Marche